Grub is an open source distributed search crawler platform.

Users of Grub could download the peer-to-peer grubclient software and let it run during their computer's idle time. The client indexed the URLs and sent them back to the main grub server in a highly compressed form. The collective crawl could then, in theory, be utilized by an indexing system, such as the one being proposed at Wikia Search. Grub was able to quickly build a large snapshot by asking thousands of clients to crawl and analyze a small portion of the web each.

Wikia has now released the entire Grub package under an open source software license. However, the old Grub clients are not functional anymore. New clients can be found on the Wikia wiki.

History 
The project was started in 2000 by Kord Campbell, Igor Stojanovski, and Ledio Ago in Oklahoma City. Intellectual property rights were acquired from Grub in January 2003 for $1.3 million in cash and stock by LookSmart. For a short time the original team continued working on the project, releasing several new versions of the software, albeit under a closed license.

Operations of Grub were shut down in late 2005. On July 27, 2007, Jimmy Wales announced that Wikia, Inc., the for-profit company developing the open source search engine Wikia Search, had acquired Grub from LookSmart on July 17 for $50,000.

References

External links

Internet search engines
Free search engine software
Free web crawlers